Houlu may refer to:
 Houlu dialect, a variety of Chinese
 Houlu Township in Guiping,  Guangxi, China